The 9th Nova Scotia general election may refer to:

Nova Scotia general election, 1806, the 9th general election to take place in the Colony of Nova Scotia, for the 9th General Assembly of Nova Scotia
1897 Nova Scotia general election, the 31st overall general election for Nova Scotia, for the (due to a counting error in 1859) 32nd Legislative Assembly of Nova Scotia, but considered the 9th general election for the Canadian province of Nova Scotia